Noney district  (Meitei pronunciation: /nō-né/) is a district in Manipur, India, created by bifurcating erstwhile Tamenglong district.

The district headquarters is located in Longmai.

Sub-divisions 

The following are the sub-divisions in Noney district:

 Longmai
 Nungba
 Khoupum
 Haochong

Demographics
Majority of the residents are ethnic Rongmei Naga with a large Inpui Naga minority in Haochong subdivision.

Rongmei language is the most commonly spoken language with few Inpui, Chiru, Gangte and Thado speakers.

See also 
 List of populated places in Noney district

Notes

References 

 
Districts of Manipur
Minority Concentrated Districts in India
2016 establishments in Manipur